Wheel gymnastics (German: Rhönradturnen) is a form of gymnastics that originated in Germany. Wheel gymnasts do exercises in a large wheel or hoop known as the Rhönrad, gymnastics wheel, gym wheel, or German wheel, in the beginning also known as ayro wheel, aero wheel, and Rhon rod.

Wheel design 
The large wheel consists of two circles in parallel, which are framed together with six spokes. Two are simple tubes, two are equipped with a handle and two have a footrest. The diameter of the wheel depends on the length of the gymnast, so that the gymnast can hold themself on the grips when fully stretched.  The wheels are available from a diameter of 130 to 245cm. The wheels weigh between 40 and 60 kg. They are available in several depths and colors.

History
The wheel was invented in 1925 by Otto Feick in Schönau an der Brend. The grandson of a blacksmith, Feick was inspired by the memory of an event from his childhood in Reichenbach, when he had tied sticks between two hoops that his grandfather had made and rolled down a hill.

He filed for a patent as "wheel-gymnastic and sports equipment". He had invented the wheel in Ludwigshafen am Rhein  1920–1922, on the grounds of the VSK Germania, a sports club, of which he was the founding chairman. The patent was issued on 8 November 1925; the name "Rhönrad" has been registered and protected since 1926 ("Rhön" is the name of the mountain region where the wheel was invented).

The Rhönrad was featured at the GeSoLei trade fair held in Düsseldorf in 1926.

In 1936, this sport was shown at the Olympic Games in Berlin, but was not presented as an Olympic discipline.

The focus of wheel gymnastics remains largely in Germany, but there are wheel groups in several countries and every 2 years the International Wheel Gymnastics Federation holds a  World Championships competition.  Former world champion wheel gymnast Wolfgang Bientzle moved from Germany to Chicago and runs his own company WHEEL JAM to educate and train people of every age to do Wheel gymnastics.

See also
 Cyr wheel
 Sport in Germany
 Wheel of Steel

References

External links
 http://www.usawheelgymnastics.com/ 
 http://www.rhoenrad.com/ 
 http://www.rhonrad.eu/

Circus skills
Gymnastics
German inventions
Sports originating in Germany
1925 in sports
1925 in Germany